The Trident TR-1 Trigull is a Canadian amphibious aircraft that was developed by Trident Aircraft of Burnaby, British Columbia and later Sidney, British Columbia. The aircraft was intended to be supplied as a complete ready-to-fly certified aircraft. The company encountered financial difficulties and only three prototypes were ever built.

Design and development
The Trigull was designed as an improved and updated Republic RC-3 Seabee. It features a cantilever high-wing, a four to six seat enclosed  cabin, retractable tricycle landing gear and a single engine in pusher configuration.

The aircraft is made from aluminum sheet with the forward cabin made from fibreglass. Standard engines available were initially intended to be the Continental Tiara 6-285  and Tiara 6-320  four-stroke powerplants. Later the  Lycoming IO-540-M1A5D and turbocharged  Lycoming TIO-540-J2BD were used.

The design incorporates some innovative features, including wing tip floats that retract into the wing tips and provide additional wing area and lift, a nose wheel that retracts into the nose to act as a bumper for mooring on water and drooping ailerons.

The Trigull was specifically designed to compete with the Republic RC-3 Seabee, Lake Buccaneer and the SIAI-Marchetti FN.333 Riviera.

Trident Aircraft was founded in February 1970 to develop the TR-1. The aircraft first flight was on 5 August 1973, with the second prototype first flying on 2 July 1976. The TR-1 Trigull 285 model's Canadian Transport Canada aircraft certification was completed on 28 October 1976 with US Federal Aviation Administration certification following on 16 December 1976. Series production was to commence in the early 1980s, and orders were received for 43 aircraft, plus 23 options. The project received technical assistance from both Canadair and Grumman Aerospace Corporation. Despite financial assistance from the federal government's Ministry of Industry, Trade and Commerce and the provincial government's British Columbia Development Corporation, the company ran out of capital and ceased operations in 1980.

Although intended for series production, only three prototypes were ever built by Trident. Two were registered and flown, CF-TRI (later C-FTRI) and C-GATE, while the third was an engineering test airframe.

The type certificate has been held by Viking Air of Sidney, British Columbia since 2006. Viking Air also owns the two remaining prototype aircraft. In 2003 Viking Air indicated an interest in producing the Trigull as a turbine-powered amphibian, with a price at that time estimated at US$400,000, but since then no further news has been released.

Variants
TR-1 Trigull 285
Model with the Continental Tiara 6-285  engine and four seats. Type certified in Canada on 28 October 1976 and in the United States on 16 December 1976.
TR-1 Trigull 320
Model with the Continental Tiara 6-320  engine and six seats.

Specifications (Trigull 285)

See also

References

Further reading

External links
Photos of the two Trigull prototypes flown

Amphibious aircraft
1970s Canadian civil utility aircraft
Single-engined pusher aircraft
High-wing aircraft
TR-1
Aircraft first flown in 1973
Flying boats